Hoyt is a community in the Canadian province of New Brunswick, with a long history dating from the 1800s.

History

Notable people

See also
List of communities in New Brunswick

References

Communities in Sunbury County, New Brunswick